The Roman Catholic Diocese of Frederico Westphalen is a diocese located in the city of Frederico Westphalen in the ecclesiastical province of Passo Fundo in Brazil.

History
 22 May 1961: Established as Diocese of Frederico Westphalen from the Diocese of Passo Fundo and Diocese of Santa Maria

Leadership
 Bishops of Frederico Westphalen (Roman rite)
João Aloysio Hoffmann † (26 March 1962 - 27 May 1971) Appointed, Bishop of Erexim
Bruno Maldaner † (27 May 1971 - 12 December 2001) Retired
Zeno Hastenteufel (12 December 2001 - 28 March 2007) Appointed, Bishop of Novo Hamburgo
Antônio Carlos Rossi Keller (11 June 2008 – present)

References
 GCatholic.org
 Catholic Hierarchy
 Diocese website (Portuguese)

Roman Catholic dioceses in Brazil
Christian organizations established in 1961
Frederico Westphalen, Roman Catholic Diocese of
Roman Catholic dioceses and prelatures established in the 20th century
1961 establishments in Brazil
Roman Catholic bishops of Frederico Westphalen